Tom Amos (born 6 February 1998) is a Swedish footballer who plays as a goalkeeper for Hapoel Be'er Sheva from Israeli Premier League.

References

External links 
 

1998 births
Living people
Swedish Jews
Jewish footballers
Swedish footballers
Footballers from Gothenburg
Ettan Fotboll players
IFK Göteborg players
Utsiktens BK players
Jönköpings Södra IF players
Hapoel Be'er Sheva F.C. players
Allsvenskan players
Superettan players
Israeli Premier League players
Association football goalkeepers